Acacia sphenophylla is a shrub of the genus Acacia and the subgenus Phyllodineae that is endemic to a small area in western Australia.

Description
It has coarsely or sharply pungent branchlets that can be glabrous or quite hairy and covered with a fine white powder at the extremities. Like most species of Acacia it has phyllodes rather than true leaves. The ascending to erect and pungent phyllodes have an inequilateral wedge-shaped to obtriangular shape. It blooms from July to August and produces yellow flowers. The spherical to obloid shaped flower-heads contain 15 to 30 golden coloured flowers. Following flowering blacking coloured firmly chartaceous to thinly coriaceous-crustaceous seed pods form that resemble a string of beads.

Taxonomy
The species was first formally described by the botanist Bruce Maslin in 1999 as part of the work Acacia miscellany. The taxonomy of fifty-five species of Acacia, primarily Western Australian, in section Phyllodineae (Leguminosae: Mimosoideae) as published in the journal Nuytsia. It was reclassified as Racosperma sphenophyllum by Leslie Pedley in 2003 then transferred back to genus Acacia in 2006. It resembles and can be confused with Acacia acanthoclada subsp. glaucescens and is also similar to Acacia pravifolia.

Distribution
It is native to an area in the Mid West region of Western Australia where it is often situated on low rises and sandplains growing in sandy or sandy-loam soils.

See also
List of Acacia species

References

sphenophylla
Acacias of Western Australia
Taxa named by Bruce Maslin
Plants described in 1999